Dr. Alexander Smirle Lawson (April 23, 1888 – December 22, 1963), was a star football player in the Canadian Football League.

Lawson was born in Guelph, Ontario. He played for four seasons for the Toronto Argonauts. He was inducted into the Canadian Football Hall of Fame in 1963 and into the Canada's Sports Hall of Fame in 1975.  He died, aged 75, in Toronto, Ontario.

References
 Canada's Sports Hall of Fame profile

1888 births
1963 deaths
Canadian Football Hall of Fame inductees
Players of Canadian football from Ontario
Sportspeople from Guelph
Toronto Argonauts players
Toronto Varsity Blues football players